Uwe Handrich (born 26 April 1959 in Elgersburg) is a former East German luger who competed during the early 1980s. He won the gold medal in the men's singles event at the 1982 FIL European Luge Championships in Winterberg, West Germany.

References
List of European luge champions 

German male lugers
Living people
1959 births
People from Ilm-Kreis
Sportspeople from Thuringia
20th-century German people